Vnislav was the fourth of the seven Bohemian mythical princes between the (also mythical) founder of the Přemyslid dynasty Přemysl the Ploughman and the first historical prince Bořivoj. The names of the princes were first recorded in Cosmas chronicle and then transmitted into the most of historical books of the 19th century including František Palacký's The History of the Czech Nation in Bohemia and Moravia.

One theory about the number of the princes is propped on the frescoes on the walls of the Rotunda in Znojmo, Moravia but Anežka Merhautová claimed that the frescoes depict all the members of the Přemyslid dynasty including the Moravian junior princes.

Origin of the name 

Vnislav's name is a typical Slavonic name ending in -slav (such as Wenceslas, Vladislav, Vítězslav etc.) but there is confusion about the first part. Záviš Kalandra thought the names of the seven princes were cryptical names of ancient Slavonic days of the week - Vnislav being the fourth - Wednesday, in Latin dies Mercurii whereas Vnislav could refer to a Slavonic god of profit. Another theory says that the names were mistaken from a coherent and partly interrupted old Slavonic text.

Seven mythical princes after Přemysl

Notes 

Mythical Bohemian princes
Přemyslid dynasty
Fictional Czech people